This is a list of the European Routes, or E-road highways, that run through the Croatia. The current network is signposted according to the 2016 system revision, and contains seven Class A roads and three Class B roads within the country.

Most of the roads are motorways that also carry various national A-numbers (for Autocesta), and there are several state roads with D-numbers (for Državna cesta).

Class-A European routes

Class-B European routes

See also 
 Highways in Croatia
 Roads in Croatia
 Ministry of Maritime Affairs, Transport and Infrastructure
 Hrvatske autoceste
 Hrvatske ceste

References 

Croatia
Road transport in Croatia